Across the Sea of Suns is a Jefferson Starship live album.  The album was produced by using recordings from four different live venues: The Bottom Line in New York City; The IMAC at Huntington, New York; New Park Entertainment in Philadelphia; and The Keswick Theatre in Glenside, Pennsylvania. The album had further studio production at American Recording in Calabasas, California. Most of the tracks used for the final album were from The Bottom Line, and none of the tracks recorded in Philadelphia were used. The album was released as a double CD. Grace Slick provided liner notes, writing her own thoughts about sixteen of the songs included.

Track listing

Personnel
Paul Kantner – 12-string guitar, vocals
Marty Balin – vocals, acoustic guitar, percussion
Slick Aguilar – electric guitar, vocals
Prairie Prince – drums, percussion
Diana Mangano – vocals
Chris Smith – piano, synthesizer

Additional Personnel
John Ferenzik – organ on "Good Shepherd", "Miracles", "Hearts" and "Hey Frederick"

Production
Michael Gaiman – producer, engineer, recordist, manager
Ricky Schultz – executive producer
Bill Cooper – assistant engineer
Michael Eisenstein – stage manager, guitar technician
Allen Pepper – live producer at the Bottom Line
Michael Rothbard – live producer at Intermedia Arts Center
Bill Rogers – live producer at New Park Entertainment
Sid Payne – live producer at New Park Entertainment
Roy Snyder – live producer at The Keswick Theatre
"Good Shepherd", "Miracles", "Hearts" and "Hey Frederick" recorded June 22, 2001, at the Keswick Theatre
"My Best Friend" and "J. P. P. McStep B. Blues" recorded February 19, 1999, at the IMAC in Huntington, New York
All other tracks recorded June 3, 2001, at The Bottom Line in New York City
Edited by Bill Cooper and Ricky at American Recording, Calabasas, California
Mastered by Joe Gastwirt at Ocean View Digital Mastering, Los Angeles
Grace Slick – liner notes
Doug Veloric – other notes
NASA – cover art
Brian Lehrhoff – live band photography
Doug Haverty – Art Direction & Design

References

Notes

1999 live albums
Albums recorded at the Bottom Line
Jefferson Starship albums